Coloradisuchus is an extinct genus of protosuchid crocodylomorph known from the Late Triassic Los Colorados Formation in Argentina. It contains a single species, Coloradisuchus abelini.

References 

Crocodylomorphs